Fantassin was one of four s built for the French Navy in the first decade of the 20th century. During World War I, she had to be scuttled by another French ship after being badly damaged during a collision in 1915.

Design and description
The Chasseur class was based on the preceding , albeit oil-fired boilers rather than the coal-fired ones of the earlier ships. Designed to displaced , the ships displaced  at deep load. Their crew numbered 77–79 men.

The Chasseur class was powered by three Parsons direct-drive steam turbines, each driving one propeller shaft, using steam provided by four Normand boilers. Fantassin handily exceeded that speed during her sea trials, reaching .

The primary armament of the Chasseur-class ships consisted of six  Modèle 1902 guns in single mounts, one each fore and aft of the superstructure and the others were distributed amidships. They were also fitted with three  torpedo tubes. One of these was in a fixed mount in the bow and the other two were on single rotating mounts amidships.

Construction and career
Fantassin was ordered from Forges et Chantiers de la Méditerranée and was launched from its La Seyne-sur-Mer shipyard on 17 June 1909. The ship was completed in June 1911. During the First World War, Fantassin was badly damaged when the French destroyer  accidentally rammed her in the Ionian Sea on 5 June 1915. The French destroyer  consequently scuttled Fantassin.

References

Bibliography

Chasseur-class destroyers
Ships built in France
1909 ships
Maritime incidents in 1915
Scuttled vessels
Ships sunk in collisions
World War I shipwrecks in the Mediterranean Sea